Naquetia annandalei is a species of sea snail, a marine gastropod mollusk in the family Muricidae, the murex snails or rock snails.

Description
The species attains a size of 100 mm.

Distribution
This marine species occurs in the Bay of Bengal; off Vietnam; the Philippine Islands; Taiwan; South Japan; Queensland, Australia; and the Marquesas

References

 Preston, H.B. (1910) Description of five new species of marine shells from the Bay of Bengal. Records of the Indian Museum, 5, 117–121.
 Houart, R., Moe, C. & Chen C. (2021). Living species of the genera Chicomurex Arakawa, 1964 and Naquetia Jousseaume, 1880 (Gastropoda: Muricidae) in the Indo-West Pacific. Novapex. 22 (hors-série 14): 1-52.

Muricidae
Gastropods described in 1910